Howl of the Lonely Crowd is an album by British indie pop band Comet Gain. It was the band's first album to be released via the Fortuna Pop! record label.

Track listing
All tracks written by David Christian except where noted.

References

2011 albums
Comet Gain albums
What's Your Rupture? albums
Fortuna Pop! Records albums